Cork is an unincorporated community located in Metcalfe County, Kentucky, United States.

References

Unincorporated communities in Metcalfe County, Kentucky
Unincorporated communities in Kentucky